Thamankaduwa Divisional Secretariat is a  Divisional Secretariat  of Polonnaruwa District, of North Central Province, Sri Lanka. It contains Parakrama Samudra and the historic ruins of the Polonnaruwa period.

Geography

It is bounded on the North by Lankapura Divisional Secretariat and Hingurakgoda Divisional Secretariat divisions, to the East by Dimbulagala Divisional Secretariat and Welikanda Divisional Secretariat divisions, on the South by the Matale District and on the West by Elahera Divisional Secretariat and Hingurakgoda Divisional Secretariat divisions.

References

 Divisional Secretariats Portal

Divisional Secretariats of Polonnaruwa District